The Phantom of the Opera is a 1989 American horror film directed by Dwight H. Little and based on Gaston Leroux's 1910 novel of the same name. The film is an updated and gorier version of Leroux's classic tale, and stars Robert Englund as the Phantom. The film was a critical and commercial failure.

Plot
Christine Daaé (Jill Schoelen), a young opera singer in modern-day Manhattan, is searching for a unique piece to sing at her next audition. Her friend and manager Meg (Molly Shannon) discovers an old opera piece called Don Juan Triumphant, written by a composer named Erik Destler. Curious, Christine and Meg do a little research on Destler and discover he may have been responsible for many murders and the disappearance of a young female opera singer he was said to have been obsessed with. While Christine is alone, she sings from the tattered parchment, and blood seeps from the notes and covers her hands. Shocked, she discovers this to be an illusion when Meg returns. Christine auditions with the piece, and during her performance, an accident with a falling sandbag renders her unconscious and shatters a mirror.

She awakens in London in 1885, wearing opera clothing. A different version of Meg (Emma Rawson) is also there. Christine turns out to be the understudy to the diva La Carlotta (Stephanie Lawrence), who is both jealous and resentful of Christine's skill. During this whole time, Erik Destler (Robert Englund) attacks the scene-shifter Joseph (Terence Beesley) with a blade high above the rafters for almost killing Christine with the falling sandbag, and blaming the accident on him.

Alone in her dressing room, Christine hears the voice of Erik Destler, revealing he is her teacher and an angel sent by her deceased father. Destler encourages her to practice Carlotta's part of Marguerite in Faust, saying that only she can sing the part. Christine complies. That evening, Carlotta discovers Joseph's skinned (but barely alive) body in her dressing closet. The event causes her to scream and lose her voice. Christine is cast in the role of Marguerite, which causes panic to the opera house owner Martin Barton (Bill Nighy), who favors Carlotta and the prestige she brings to his opera house.

During the scene where Dr. Faust signs his soul to the Devil, Destler reminisces about a time, decades ago, when he sold his own soul to the Devil in exchange for people loving him for his music. The Devil grants his wish, but disfigures Destler's face, telling him that only his music will be what people love him for. Christine gives a stellar performance, receiving a standing ovation, and celebrates that night with her fiancé Richard Dutton (Alex Hyde-White). She tells him of her mysterious "teacher" to whom she accredits her success. A mildly jealous Richard asks to meet this teacher, but Christine insists her teacher is only a figment of her imagination. Meanwhile, Destler seduces a prostitute and pays her gold to call herself "Christine" for the night.

Shockingly, the next morning in the papers, Christine is given a bad review by the famous opera critic E.A. Harrison, secretly done as a favor to Barton. Destler tracks Harrison down and brutally murders him in a Turkish spa after Harrison refuses to recant his review. Christine tearfully goes to the graveyard and prays at her father's grave. Destler appears as a shadowy violinist and offers her a chance at musical immortality if she will only go to him. Christine goes away with the Phantom in his stagecoach. Deep in the sewers below London's opera house, Destler reveals himself as the composer of Don Juan Triumphant, which causes a spark of recollection within Christine. She sings the same lyrics from the beginning of the film. Destler places his ring upon her finger and warns her never to see another man again. Christine, through fear, promises she will not. Destler kisses her hand, declaring her to be his bride.

Richard goes to Inspector Hawkins (Terence Harvey), who reveals that the Phantom is not only the legendary Erik Destler, but has lived for decades, uses the opera house's catacombs as a hideout, and skins his murdered victims for their facial skin to cover his own hideous visage. Richard has heard that the only way to kill the Phantom is to destroy his music.

After hearing of Harrison's murder, Christine meets Richard at a masquerade ball and begs him to take her away. She fears the Phantom and really loves Richard. Erik, disguised as Red Death, witnesses this exchange and becomes enraged. He decapitates Carlotta, causing mayhem, and kidnaps Christine. Hawkins, Richard, and the rat catcher (Yehuda Efroni), whom Destler has been bribing in the past, go quickly in pursuit. Back in the Phantom's lair, an enraged Destler attempts to rape Christine but hears the men approaching. He tells Christine she can never leave and locks her in the lair. Two policemen become lost in the sewers and are killed by Destler, including the rat catcher for betraying him.

He returns to Christine, who asks him if he is going to kill her too. Destler replies, "This is either a wedding march or a funeral mass. You decide which." Richard and Inspector Hawkins burst in. After a brutal fight with the Phantom, Richard is stabbed, set aflame, and killed instantly. Christine sets the lair on fire by pushing over candelabras and attempts to kill Destler, but he grabs her hand and tries to lead her away with him. However, a wounded Hawkins manages to shoot Destler. Christine pushes another candle holder through a mirror, which sends her back to her own time. As she vanishes, she hears Destler's echoing voice screaming her name.

Christine awakens back to the present-day in Manhattan and meets the opera's producer, Mr. Foster, who comforts her and offers her the leading part. They have drinks at his apartment, and Foster goes upstairs to change and finds a blemish on his face, revealing that Foster is really Destler from long ago. He prepares to change his facial skin with synthetic ones he keeps in a special lab. Meanwhile, downstairs, Christine discovers a copy of the Don Juan Triumphant music score. Foster/Destler enters, reveals his true identity to her, and lovingly kisses her lips. Christine pretends to accept him, then rips off his mask, stabs him, and escapes, taking his music. She tears it apart and lets it drop into a drain, whilst Foster/Destler is heard screaming.

Christine passes by a street violin player on her way home, whom she gives some money to. The violinist starts playing the theme from Don Juan Triumphant. Christine looks back and reflects on the music for a while. Then, very resolutely, she turns around and continues on her way, wondering if Destler is really gone for good.

Cast
 Robert Englund as Erik Destler, The Phantom of the Opera/Mr. Foster
 Jill Schoelen as Christine Day
 Alex Hyde-White as Richard Dutton
 Bill Nighy as Martin Barton
 Stephanie Lawrence as La Carlotta
 Molly Shannon as Meg (New York)
 Emma Rawson as Meg (London)
 Terence Harvey as Inspector Hawkins
 Nathan Lewis as Davies
 Peter Clapham as Harrison
 Yehuda Efroni as The Rat Catcher
 Terence Beesley as Joseph Buquet
 Mark Ryan as Mott
 Nancy Fontana as the singing voice of Christine

Production
The script was originally written by Gerry O'Hara for Cannon films, and was set to be directed by John Hough. O'Hara's version of the screenplay did not feature any present-day segments, and was set entirely in 1881 England. However, after Cannon filed for bankruptcy, the film was passed on to the 21st Century Film Corporation. 21st Century planned to follow up the film with a sequel called The Phantom of the Opera 2: Terror in Manhattan, in which the Phantom lives in the sewers of present-day Manhattan. Television writer Duke Sandefur was hired to add bookend segments set in present-day Manhattan to O'Hara's script, so that the film would tie into its proposed sequel. Ultimately, the sequel was not made, but the bookend segments remain in the film.

The original music, written for the film by Misha Segal (also known for the soundtrack to The New Adventures of Pippi Longstocking), won a 1989 Brit for best soundtrack. Segal also commissioned the Budapest Symphony Orchestra for the theme. Of particular interest to fans of the original novel is Segal's rendition of the Phantom's opera composition 'Don Juan Triumphant', with the Phantom on the organ and Christine singing.

Release

Box office
The Phantom of the Opera opened theatrically on November 3, 1989 in 1,468 venues, ranking sixth at the domestic box office, with $2,050,000 in its first weekend. The film closed three weeks later, having grossed $3,953,745.

Critical reception
The film received negative reviews from critics. Caryn James of The New York Times wrote, "This 'Phantom' is not lively enough to be kitschy, or original enough in its badness to be funny." Variety called the film "competent but flatly directed," adding that "Englund is his usual broad self. Yet gorehounds expecting a 'Freddy of the Opera' are bound to be disappointed, for the stabbings, stranglings and decapitations he executes lack suspense, surprise or innovation." Dave Kehr of the Chicago Tribune called it "a stern, lugubrious affair, almost completely devoid of the humor and invention that have made the 'Nightmare' films consistently watchable." Kim Newman of The Monthly Film Bulletin wrote that it "occasionally has a pleasant Hammer Films/Gothic feel," but that "Englund is buried under thick make-up even when trying to pass for normal and is unable to do much with the role."

The film holds a 38% 'Rotten' rating on review aggregate website Rotten Tomatoes, based on 13 reviews.

Home media
Scream Factory (a subsidiary of Shout! Factory) released the film on February 17, 2015 for the first time on Blu-ray Disc in the United States. The film was released alongside the documentary film, Behind the Mask: The Making of "The Phantom of the Opera". The documentary film featured interviews with Englund, Nighy, Hyde-White, Shannon, and director Little. The alternative title cover of the film was "Freddy: The Musical".

Cancelled sequel
Englund was under contract to appear in a sequel, but it was canceled after the film's poor reception, and has been the subject of numerous rumors. Fangoria Magazine stated in 1991 that the script was re-written into what became 1992's film Dance Macabre, also starring Englund.

Englund confirmed in a 2004 interview that a script had been written, and while he personally felt it was superior to the first film, it had never been filmed in any capacity. In 2012, Englund was asked at a memorabilia sale about the possibility of a sequel happening in the near future; Englund informed everybody in attendance that although it would be overwhelming to see a sequel, the chances of it happening at this stage are "highly unlikely".

References

External links

 
 
 
 
 
 

1989 films
1980s English-language films
1989 horror films
1989 drama films
American drama films
American supernatural horror films
American slasher films
American independent films
Films about violins and violinists
Films about composers
Films about opera
Films based on horror novels
Films based on The Phantom of the Opera
Films directed by Dwight H. Little
Films set in London
Films set in Manhattan
Films set in the 19th century
Films set in the 1980s
Films set in 1885
Films set in 1989
Films shot in Budapest
Films shot in England
Films shot in London
Films shot in New York City
American monster movies
The Devil in film
Columbia Pictures films
1980s monster movies
21st Century Film Corporation films
Films produced by Menahem Golan
1980s American films